Anne Fulda (born 10 May 1963) is a French journalist working for Le Figaro in the politics department since 1982. She is a specialist of French politics and in particular of French right-wing politics. She wrote a book about Jacques Chirac in 1997. She was allegedly the mistress of the former French President Nicolas Sarkozy from 2005 to 2006.

Bibliography
 Un président très entouré (1997) - Grasset 
 François Baroin, le faux discret (2012) - Paris, Lattès 
 Portraits de femmes (2016) - Paris, Plon
 Emmanuel Macron, un jeune homme si parfait (2017) - Plon

Articles
Les vacances de M. le President

References

1963 births
Living people
Journalists from Paris
Sciences Po alumni
20th-century French journalists
21st-century French journalists
French women journalists
20th-century French women writers
21st-century French women writers
Le Figaro people
French people of Italian descent